The Zygopteridales is an extinct order of ferns or fern-like plants which grew primarily during the Carboniferous. It comprises two families: Zygopteridaceae, which contains at least a dozen named genera, and Teledeaceae, which comprises two genera (Teledea and Senftenbergia). A few other genera are of uncertain placement and are not assigned to any family yet.

References

Carboniferous plants
Devonian plants
Permian plants
Cretaceous extinctions
Prehistoric plant orders
Fern orders